The 2019 Men's Junior AHF Cup was the fifth edition of the Men's Junior AHF Cup, the qualification tournament for the Men's Hockey Junior Asia Cup organized by the Asian Hockey Federation.

It was held at the Sultan Qaboos Sports Complex in Muscat, Oman from 5 to 14 December 2019. The top four teams qualified for the 2021 Junior Asia Cup.

China won the tournament for the second time by defeating the hosts Oman 4–2 in a shoot-out after the match ended 0–0. Chinese Taipei won the bronze medal by defeating Uzbekistan 5–3.

Teams
The participating teams were announced on 15 November 2019. Afghanistan withdrew before the tournament.

Results
All times are local, GST (UTC+4).

Preliminary round

Pool A

Pool B

Fifth to ninth place classification

Cross-over

Seventh place game

Fifth place game

First to fourth place classification

Semi-finals

Third place game

Final

Statistics

Final standings

Awards
The following awards were given at the conclusion of the tournament.

Goalscorers

See also
2019 Women's Junior AHF Cup

References

Junior AHF Cup
Junior AHF Cup
Sport in Muscat, Oman
International field hockey competitions hosted by Oman
Junior AHF Cup
AHF Cup
21st century in Muscat, Oman
Men's Junior AHF Cup